Kroll is a German, Anglo-Saxon, and Scottish surname. 

Notable people with the surname include:

 Colin Kroll (1983/4–2018), American businessman; co-founder of Vine and HQ Trivia
 Eric Kroll (born 1946), American photographer
 Fredric Kroll (born 1945), American composer and writer
 Heinrich Kroll (1894-1930), German World War I flying ace
 Henryk Kroll (born 1949), Polish politician, leader of German minority in Poland
 Joachim Kroll (1933–1991), German serial killer
 Jules Kroll, (born 1941), American CEO of Kroll Bond Rating Agency and Chairman of K2Global
 Leon Kroll (1884–1974), American painter
 Nick Kroll (born 1978), American actor and comedian, son of Jules Kroll
 Ted Kroll (1919–2002), professional golfer
 Una Kroll (1925-2017), British nun, missionary doctor, parliamentary candidate, priest, and campaigner for women's ordination
 Wilhelm Kroll (1869–1939), German philologist
 William Justin Kroll (1889–1973), Luxemburger metallurgist, inventor of the Kroll process
 William Kroll (1901–1980), American violinist and composer 
 Woodrow M. Kroll (born 1944), American evangelist, principal of the "Back to the Bible" radio ministry

See also
 Krol
 Croll

German-language surnames
Surnames from nicknames